Peyk is a village in Charuymaq-e Markazi Rural District, in the Central District of Charuymaq County, East Azerbaijan Province, Iran. At the 2006 census, its population was 218, in 50 families.

References 

Populated places in Charuymaq County